Joe Randazzo (born March 28, 1978) is an American comedy writer, stand-up comedian, and improvisational comedian. He is a former editor of the satirical newspaper, The Onion. In addition to performing stand-up, Randazzo has been a guest host of the improv comedy show ASSSSCAT 3000 at New York City's Upright Citizens Brigade Theatre. An avid user of Twitter
 and a critic of Internet memes, Randazzo was nominated for a 2009 ECNY Award for Outstanding Performance in the Field of Tweeting. Randazzo has appeared on NPR's This American Life, PBS's Charlie Rose, and MSNBC's Morning Joe. Randazzo was awarded the Burke Medal for Outstanding Contribution to Public Discourse through the Arts by the College Historical Society of Trinity College Dublin in 2012.

Early life and education
Randazzo is from Penacook, New Hampshire. He earned a bachelor's degree in broadcast journalism from Emerson College, and worked for NPR in Boston shortly thereafter.

Career
After moving to New York, Randazzo met Carol Kolb of The Onion while performing improv comedy at the Magnet Theater.

In 2016, He helped write Donald Trump's The Art of the Deal: The Movie, which was a parody of Donald Trump's autobiographical novel of the same name.

Randazzo left his job at Manhattan Fruitier, a fruit basket company, in March 2006 to join the editorial staff of The Onion. He was a writer and section editor of The Onion'''s 2007 book Our Dumb World, a parody of the standard desk atlas, and was promoted to editor in 2008. In Randazzo's tenure, The Onion published the compilation Our Front Pages, was fictitiously sold to a Chinese conglomerate, and openly campaigned for a Pulitzer Prize. Randazzo, who lives in Brooklyn, will have reportedly left The Onion when they moved their editorial offices to Chicago.

Books
 Our Front Pages: 21 Years of Greatness, Virtue, and Moral Rectitude from America's Finest News Source (Onion Presents). The Onion, Scribner, 2009. 
 Our Dumb World. The Onion'', Little, Brown and Company, 2008.

References

External links
 The Joe Randazzo Association
 Twitter: @RandazzoJ
 BigThink Interview
 Stand-up at Chicago Underground Comedy

1978 births
American stand-up comedians
Living people
Writers from New Hampshire
Emerson College alumni
Members of the Democratic Socialists of America
People from Concord, New Hampshire
21st-century American comedians